Berghuis v. Thompkins, 560 U.S. 370 (2010), is a landmark decision by the Supreme Court of the United States in which the Court considered the position of a suspect who understands their right to remain silent under Miranda v. Arizona and is aware that they have the right to remain silent, but does not explicitly invoke or waive the right.

The Court held that unless and until the suspect actually states that they are relying on their right(s), their subsequent voluntary statements may be used in court and police may continue to interact with (or question) them. The mere act of remaining silent is, on its own, insufficient to imply the suspect has invoked their rights. Furthermore, a voluntary reply even after lengthy silence can be construed as to implying a waiver.

The Court was split, 5–4. The dissent, authored by Justice Sonia Sotomayor, argued that Miranda and other previous cases had required a claimed waiver of a constitutional right to be shown more strongly, especially in light of a lengthy interrogation with a possible "compelling influence" during which the accused had remained almost entirely silent for almost 3 hours prior to the self-incriminating statement.

Responses from legal observers and the media were divided. Many considered Berghuis a further erosion of Miranda and were concerned it was "turning the clocks back" on safeguards developed in previous cases. At least one scholar has argued that Thompkins effectively gutted Miranda. Others saw the ruling as a sign of strength and a signal that the Court, under its own impetus, was willing to address known issues resulting from the view of terrorism as crime. The more common view was concerned that vulnerable citizens could now be placed under pressure and, despite having an understanding of their rights, could be more easily coerced in a manner prejudicial to their interests.

Background of the case

Legal background
Under U.S. law and with rare exceptions, people (whether criminal suspects or defendants or not) have the right to remain silent as part of their right not to incriminate themselves under the Fifth Amendment to the United States Constitution. Remaining silent is optional—they may speak or be silent as they wish. The Miranda warning concerns the duty of the police or other formal questioners to make sure that the suspect is aware they have that right prior to questioning, in case they want to be silent at some point or the suspect later pleads ignorance that they had the right (and would have relied upon it had they been aware). Miranda v. Arizona  and related cases contemplate that a suspect might invoke their rights (make clear they wish to rely on them), waive their rights (make clear they do not wish to rely on them), or do neither of these. A number of cases such as the present one, refine Miranda by addressing when and at what point a suspect, who is aware that they have the right to remain silent, is said to have begun to rely on that right, as opposed to when they were aware of the right but were not choosing to rely on it.

Interrogation and conviction
Van Chester Thompkins was considered a suspect in a fatal shooting on January 10, 2000, in Southfield, Michigan. After advising Thompkins of his Miranda rights, police officers interrogated him. Thompkins did not state at any time that he wanted to rely on his right to remain silent, nor that he did not want to talk to the police, nor that he wanted an attorney. The court record suggested that he had been almost completely silent during the three-hour interrogation and the few sporadic comments he made had no bearing on the case (police described it as "nearly a monologue"), but near the end, detectives changed their approach and "tried a spiritual tac[k]"  and an "appeal to his conscience and religious beliefs". Thompkins was asked in sequence—did he believe in God, did he pray to God, and did he pray to God to forgive him for shooting the victim. He answered "yes" to each of these. Thompkins made a motion to suppress his statements, claiming that he had invoked his Fifth Amendment right to remain silent, that he had not waived that right, and that his inculpatory statements were involuntary. The trial court denied his motion and Thompkins was found guilty by a jury and sentenced to life imprisonment without the possibility of parole. Of note, there had been significant other evidence of guilt corroborating the conviction.

State court appeal and federal court habeas corpus proceedings
Thompkins appealed his conviction on grounds that included suppression of his admission—that he had invoked and not waived his right to remain silent—and deficient representation related to improper jury instructions, but the Michigan Court of Appeals rejected Thompkins' Miranda claim. Thompkins then filed a writ of habeas corpus in federal District Court but it denied his request. However, the United States Court of Appeals for the Sixth Circuit reversed the District Court's decision, holding that the state court was unreasonable in finding an implied waiver of Thompkins' right to remain silent.

Petition to the U.S. Supreme Court
The state's petition to the Supreme Court advanced a number of reasons to hold that extended silence should not be construed as an invocation, and asserted that the interview in the present case had not been coercive.

The Court's decision

On June 1, 2010, by a vote of 5–4, the Supreme Court reversed the Sixth Circuit's decision. In the Opinion of the Court, written by Associate Justice Anthony Kennedy, the Court ruled that Thompkins' silence during the interrogation did not invoke his right to remain silent and that he had waived his right to remain silent when he knowingly and voluntarily made a statement to police.

(On the other issue considered, the court ruled that prejudice due to deficient representation in respect of jury instruction was "doubtful", but even if it had been deficient, other evidence of guilt corroborating the conviction made it unlikely that a change of jury instruction would have made any difference.)

Majority opinion
The Court reasoned as follows on Thompkins' various arguments:

There was no good reason why the standard for invoking the Miranda right to remain silent and the Miranda right to counsel should differ. "Both protect... against compulsory self-incrimination... by requiring an interrogation to cease when either right is invoked". Making either of these statements would have ended the questions but the accused made neither of them.

The court further considered whether invocation of Miranda rights could be implied from the behavior or ambiguous words of the accused. It concluded (in line with previous cases such as Davis v. United States) that there was good reason why invoking these rights should require an unambiguous act of the accused, including certainty for police, prosecutors, and accused, and social benefit in law enforcement.

The court then considered whether the accused had taken action that waived those rights. Waiver must be a free choice with full awareness (Moran v. Burbine). Miranda v. Arizona (the Miranda ruling) states that "[A] heavy burden rests on the government to demonstrate that the defendant knowingly and intelligently waived his privilege against self-incrimination and his right to retained or appointed counsel." It was noted that the accused had read and expressed understanding of the rights, and had them read aloud, he had not pleaded lack of understanding, was given time, and therefore knew his rights. Specifically, having read the 5th warning ("you have the right to decide at any time before or during questioning to use your right to remain silent and your right to talk with a lawyer while you are being questioned") he was aware this right was enduring and could be applied at any time in the questioning if he chose, and the police would have to honor the invocation if he did so. The court observed that "[p]olice are not required to rewarn suspects from time to time". That a question is linked to religious beliefs does not cause the reply to be "involuntary". The accused, understanding his rights and that they were capable of invocation at any point, had not chosen to invoke them.

This is ignoring the fact that the question asked was a loaded question and the defendant would have been indicted in either case according to the traditional logic and rhetoric of legal interrogation.  The custodial interview ended about 15 minutes after the following. "Q: Do you believe in God. A: Yes Q: Do you pray to God? A: Yes Q: Do you pray to God to forgive you for shooting that boy down? A: Yes." {Berghuis v. Thompkins, 560 U.S. 370, 376, 130 S. Ct. 2250, 2257 L. Ed. 2d. 1098 (2010).}   

The case of North Carolina v. Butler   showed that a waiver of Miranda rights may be implied through "the defendant's silence, coupled with an understanding of his rights and a course of conduct indicating waiver". The court held that where a Miranda warning had been given and was understood by the accused, an accused's uncoerced statement established an implied waiver of the right to remain silent. Thompkins' answer to the police question, having understood but not chosen to invoke his rights, was sufficient to show a course of conduct indicating waiver. Further corroboration was that he had sporadically made other comments as well.

The court concluded that:

Sotomayor's dissent

Associate Justice Sonia Sotomayor wrote the dissenting opinion for four Justices, her first major dissenting opinion on the Court. She wrote that the case represented "a substantial retreat from the protection against compelled self-incrimination that Miranda v. Arizona has long provided during custodial interrogation", and that "[S]uspects must now unambiguously invoke their right to remain silent—which, counterintuitively, requires them to speak. At the same time, suspects will be legally presumed to have waived their rights even if they have given no clear expression of their intent to do so."

The dissent noted that the government must satisfy the "high standar[d] of proof for the waiver of constitutional rights [set forth in] Johnson v. Zerbst". It cited from Miranda that:

and that Miranda and North Carolina v. Butler both agreed that:

The Court had previously observed that "while the privilege [against self-incrimination] is sometimes a shelter to the guilty, [it] is often a protection to the innocent" and that "[f]or these reasons, we have observed, a criminal law system which comes to depend on the 'confession' will, in the long run, be less reliable and more subject to abuses than a system relying on independent investigation."

Although giving "sporadic" comments during the interview, no answers had been given that touched upon the case. The Court had not previously considered "whether a suspect can invoke the right to remain silent by remaining uncooperative and nearly silent for 2 hours and 45 minutes" and the dissent considered that silence throughout a lengthy interrogation "long past the point when he could be deciding whether to respond[,] cannot reasonably be understood other than as an invocation of the right to remain silent". Butler also distinguished between a "sufficient course of conduct" and mere "inculpatory statements".

The dissent concluded that the ruling was unnecessary in the changes it established, "flatly contradicts" Miranda and Butler, and that "[e]ven if Thompkins did not invoke that right, he is entitled to relief because Michigan did not satisfy its burden of establishing waiver".

Other views

Prior cases 
This particular view as the majority gave is not new. In the case of United States v. Johnson, 76 F. Supp. 538, 540 (D. Pa. 1947), the court ruled that,

Legal views and responses 
Responses to the ruling were divided with a significant number of commentators focusing upon the erosion of Miranda, and others commenting upon the impact of the case on terrorism suspect interviews—a topic where Congress had recently attempted to legislate.

Cornell Law School professor Sherry F. Colb's discussion of the decision at Findlaw.com was one of the former. She called the decision "an alarming break with the philosophy of Miranda v. Arizona [that] leaves that decision to stand as an arbitrary disclosure requirement, rather than the protection against coercive interrogation that it was originally crafted to be". The author noted the purpose of Miranda was to address psychologically pressured interviews and that it had noted that adequate protection was essential in order "to dispel the compulsion inherent in custodial surroundings". The Miranda decision was intended to prevent coercion, not merely to require a "disclosure of legal facts". The present decision "allow[ed] a waiver of the right to occur after interrogation had commenced, through a response to that interrogation". As a result, two subtly different meanings of "right to remain silent" could be construed, and a suspect who was (in the words of Miranda v. Arizona) "vulnerable, unassertive, and in need of protection"—precisely the kind of suspect Miranda aimed at protecting—would be left unaware:

A joint Amicus Curiae brief on behalf of the National Association of Criminal Defense Lawyers and American Civil Liberties Union cautioned similarly:

Steven Shapiro, legal director of the ACLU, stated on similar lines in The Wall Street Journal online edition, that Berghuis "seriously undermines" Miranda, in which the court had "recognized that a suspect in police custody can be worn down by prolonged questioning and other interrogation tactics".

UC Berkeley law professor John Yoo responded in a matching article in the same publication, that the court's view provides interpretive guidance when a suspect says nothing for an extended period. More significantly (he wrote), it symbolizes and parallels the Obama administration's favoring of the "terrorism-as-crime" pre-2001 paradigm over the "terrorism-as-war" paradigm of the Bush era. (See anti-terrorism legislation and Bush Doctrine) This perspective could influence terrorism cases, when the opponents were declared to be at war, since "interrogation would seek actionable intelligence to stop attacks, not confessions for use in civilian trials". Yoo concluded that the court's "new flexibility" would perhaps allow it to "ease the burden" on military, intelligence and police" and permit "more [flexible responses to] terrorism within the criminal-justice paradigm, though at the expense of weakening the civil rights of all Americans". The present ruling might clarify that Miranda was not relevant where information was not being collected for use at a trial. As such it might act in mitigation of "weak anti-terrorism policies".

Kent Scheidegger, legal director of the Criminal Justice Legal Foundation, stated that the court had recognized the "practical realities that the police face in dealing with suspects" and placed reasonable limits on "an artificial rule that is not really in the Constitution". The statement concluded that "[t]he rule that really is in the Constitution, that no person may be compelled to be a witness against himself, is not changed by today's decision".

Emily Berman, counsel at the Brennan Center for Justice at the NYU School of Law commented that "[Berghuis]' potential consequences are as predictable as night following day: Police will interrogate criminal suspects who do not explicitly invoke their rights—often, those will be suspects who are unsophisticated, poorly educated or mentally ill—for hours on end. This will lead, just as inevitably, to more coerced—and therefore unreliable—confessions... the very phenomenon that Miranda aimed to eliminate." She noted the attorney general's comment that Miranda warnings had not deterred terrorism suspects such as Umar Farouk Abdulmutallab and Faisal Shahzad from talking and providing "valuable intelligence". The positive observation was a reflection upon attempts by Congress to amend Miranda legislatively, that the decision "sends a strong signal" that "the Supreme Court is not shy about curtailing Miranda protections, even without prodding from Congress". She concluded that "[w]hile it might look with hostility on congressional attempts to rein in the scope of the Miranda rule, the Supreme Court itself is willing to interpret narrowly the protections that Miranda affords criminal defendants. And it is willing to reach relatively far to do so."

Other legal responses included Stanford University law professor Robert Weisberg, who stated that "this decision authorizes lower courts to construe ambiguous situations in favor of police and prosecutors", and University of Michigan law professor Richard Friedman who concluded, "[t]his decision means that police can keep shooting questions at a suspect who refuses to talk as long as they want in hopes that the person will crack and give them some information... It's a little bit less restraint that the officers have to show."

At least one scholar has argued that Thompkins effectively gutted Miranda. In The Right to Remain Silent, Charles Weisselberg argues that "the majority in Thompkins rejected the fundamental underpinnings of Miranda v. Arizonas prophylactic rule and established a new one that fails to protect the rights of suspects." and that "But in Thompkins, neither Michigan nor the Solicitor General were able to cite any decision in which a court found that a suspect had given an implied waiver after lengthy questioning. Thompkins persevered for almost three hours before succumbing to his interrogators. In finding a waiver on these facts, Thompkins gives us an implied waiver doctrine on steroids."

Media response
National and regional media outlets reported a range of views similar to the above:

 Kansas City Star – "this is but one of a series of high court rulings in recent months that have effectively nipped away at the Miranda ruling. ... Perhaps because it is occurring incrementally, few outside the legal community have taken note of the trend... And besides, as long as the good guys win out over the bad, who cares how we get there, right?... We ought to care.... [z]eal for fighting crime shouldn't be allowed to undercut American standards like 'innocent until proven guilty'." It concluded that Sotomayor—the newest justice at the court—seemed to understand that "[g]ood policing is based on building cases, not on coercing confessions. ... What's the matter with the conservatives on the court?" 

 Bakersfield Californian – stated that "local attorneys [are] mixed on the decision", citing a variety of local attorneys. These included a defense attorney as saying "[t]ime will tell whether this activist conservative-majority Supreme Court is doing the right thing in moving back the clock on Miranda rights" and a district attorney as saying "Miranda had been broadened over the years far beyond what was necessary for its original goal of protecting suspects from [coercion]. ... police culture has dramatically changed for the better in the 40-plus years since it came into being". A second defense attorney was quoted as saying that "[i]t's placing too much on a person who is already in an incredibly stressful situation. If I sit you down in a chair in a little room and shine a harsh light in your face and question you for three hours, under those conditions I could get a ham sandwich to confess." A county public defender opined that the ruling was not unfavorable, as a clear answer would be preferable to uncertainty. Local police stated the ruling did not affect how interrogations would be conducted.

 Philadelphia Inquirer – asked "[s]ince when do Americans have to declare their constitutional rights out loud in order to claim them?" and that the decision had "set off ... shock waves among rights activists". It commented that "[t]he fact that DNA exonerations often upend criminal confessions that turn out to have been coerced after lengthy interrogations demonstrates the risks of such police procedures. That's a key reason Miranda rights were established in the first place". The ruling made automatic videotaping of major-crime interviews "critical". It concluded that "[i]t may seem to some that the high court ruling will enable police to nab more bad guys and make the charges stick. But by setting up a 'gotcha' set of rules about a key constitutional protection, the high court has eroded individual liberty for all Americans."

A number of newspapers, including well known and national titles such as USA Today, The New York Times and The Washington Post, and titles such as Associated Press and The Washington Times, reported the facts on both sides without stating a strong editorial position in their coverage.

Subsequent ruling in Salinas v. Texas
The U.S. Constitution's Fifth Amendment gives an individual suspected of crime a right not to be forced, by police or other government officials, into giving up evidence that would show he or she was guilty of a crime. Based on this constitutional prohibition against self-incrimination and to prevent coerced testimony by police or other government officials, the Supreme Court ruled in Miranda v. Arizona that an individual who was being held by police and was not free to leave had to be told of his/her right to remain silent. After Berghuis, a subsequent case, Salinas v. Texas, considered a suspect who was not being held against his will by police officers, but who had instead agreed to accompany officers and discuss a case upon their request. It extended Berghuis by ruling that in such a situation and prior to any arrest, the individual was not required to be explicitly told about his/her right to remain silent under the Fifth Amendment.

In Salinas, Genevevo Salinas of Houston had voluntarily gone to a police station when officers asked him to accompany them to talk about the murder of two men. Salinas answered most of the officers' questions, but simply remained silent when they asked him whether shotgun casings found at the scene of the murders would match his gun. He shifted his feet, and otherwise acted nervously, but did not say anything. Later, at his trial, prosecutors told jurors that his silence in the face of that question showed that he was guilty, that he knew that the shotgun used to kill the victims was his. Salinas' lawyer wanted the Supreme Court to rule that the simple fact of silence during police questioning, when an individual was not under arrest, could not be used against that person at a criminal trial.

The Supreme Court extended the standard from Berghuis v. Thompkins in Salinas v. Texas, 570 U.S. 178 (2013), on June 17, 2013, holding that a suspect's silence in response to a specific question posed during an interview with police when the suspect was not in custody and the suspect had been voluntarily answering other questions during that interview could be used against him in court where he did not explicitly invoke his Fifth Amendment right to silence in response to the specific question. Of the five justices who concluded that the suspect's silence could be used against him in these circumstances, Justices Alito and Kennedy and Chief Justice Roberts concluded that the defendant's Fifth Amendment claim failed because he did not expressly invoke the privilege. The other two Justices, Thomas and Scalia, concluded that the defendant's claim would fail even if he had invoked the privilege, on the theory that the prosecutor's comment at the trial—regarding the defendant's silence in response to a question during the police interview—did not compel the defendant to give self-incriminating testimony.

In essence the Supreme Court ruled the Fifth Amendment's Self-Incrimination Clause does not protect a defendant's refusal to answer questions asked by law enforcement before he has been arrested or read his Miranda rights. In the concrete case the court issued the following holding: When petitioner had not yet been placed in custody or received Miranda warnings, and voluntarily responded to some questions by police about a murder, the prosecution's use of his silence in response to another question as evidence of his guilt at trial did not violate the Fifth Amendment because petitioner failed to expressly invoke his privilege not to incriminate himself in response to the officer's question. Long-standing judicial precedent has held that any witness who desires protection against self-incrimination must explicitly claim that protection. This requirement ensures that the government is put on notice when a defendant intends to claim this privilege and allows the government to either argue that the testimony is not self-incriminating or offer immunity. The plurality opinion of Justices Alito, Roberts and Kennedy reiterated two exceptions to this principle: 1) that a criminal defendant does not need to take the stand at trial in order to explicitly claim this privilege; and 2) that failure to claim this privilege must be excused when that failure was due to government coercion. The plurality opinion declined to extend these exceptions to the situation in Salinas v. Texas. Notwithstanding popular misconceptions, the Court held that the Fifth Amendment does not establish a complete right to remain silent but only guarantees that a criminal defendant may not be forced to testify against himself or herself. Therefore, as long as police do not deprive defendants of the opportunity to claim a Fifth Amendment privilege, there is no Constitutional violation. The Court stated that there was no "ritualistic formula" necessary to assert the privilege against self-incrimination, but that a person could not do so "by simply standing mute." If an individual fails to invoke his right, and is later charged with a crime, at trial the prosecution may use his silence as evidence of his guilt.

Notes

See also
 List of United States Supreme Court cases, volume 560

References

External links
 
 Petition presented to Supreme Court
 docket files
 Case and links on SCOTUSblog
 
 Supreme Court Cases of Interest [notes] Criminal Justice, Vol. 24, Issue 4 (Winter 2010), pp. 48–51, Freeman, Carol Garfiel, 24 Criminal Justice 48 (2009–2010) [not available online at this time]

United States Supreme Court cases
United States Supreme Court cases of the Roberts Court
2010 in United States case law
Law enforcement in the United States
Miranda warning case law